Aric Michael Almirola (born March 14, 1984) is an American professional stock car racing driver. He competes full-time in the NASCAR Cup Series, driving the No. 10 Ford Mustang for Stewart-Haas Racing. A graduate of Hillsborough High School in Tampa, Almirola attended the University of Central Florida to work on a degree in mechanical engineering before leaving to pursue a career in racing.

Racing career

Early career
Almirola was born on Eglin Air Force Base in Fort Walton Beach, Florida, of Cuban descent. He began racing go-karts when he was eight years old. At age 14, he began racing nationally. He won the pole position in his debut in the World Karting Association race and finished fourth in the standings that year. Two years later, he moved up into modifieds and won several Rookie of the Year awards.

NASCAR
In 2002, Almirola moved to the NASCAR Sun Belt Weekly Racing Division and finished second in the Rookie of the Year standings. He followed that up with five pole positions in 2003. In 2004, he became one of the first drivers to participate in NASCAR's Drive for Diversity program. He also signed with Joe Gibbs Racing as a development driver under a partnership with former NFL player Reggie White. Almirola ran the season at Ace Speedway, and won two races before finishing 11th in the points standings. He won five more races at the track in 2005, and made his Truck Series debut with Morgan-Dollar Motorsports and had two top-tens in four races.

2006–07
For 2006, Almirola drove the No. 75 Spears Manufacturing-sponsored Chevy for Spears Motorsports in the Craftsman Truck Series, as part of the JGR development program. He started every race and had three Top 10 finishes, including a best finish of ninth, ending the season 18th. That season, he also drove nine races in the Busch Series for Gibbs in the No. 19 Husqvarna/Banquet Foods-sponsored Chevrolet Monte Carlo. His best finish was eleventh at Dover International Speedway. He also served as a test driver for Gibbs teammates J. J. Yeley and Denny Hamlin when their Nextel Cup and Busch Series schedules conflicted. He also scored his first career pole at the Milwaukee Mile, qualifying the No. 20 car for Denny Hamlin, who competed in the race.

Almirola moved up to the Busch series regularly in 2007, driving the No. 18 and No. 20 Chevys for Joe Gibbs, driving each car in ten races apiece. He won his second career pole award for the Orbitz 300 at Daytona. He won the pole again, for the second straight year, at the AT&T 250 at the Milwaukee Mile, but thought he was going to give up driving duties to Hamlin again; Hamlin's helicopter was unable to land in time for Hamlin to make it to the track, so Almirola started the race, leading the first 43 laps of the race. On lap 59, during a caution period, because of sponsor commitments, Hamlin took over for Almirola while he was running in the third place. Hamlin went on to win the race, but Almirola was credited with his first NASCAR Busch Series win because he was the driver who started the race. Almirola did not participate in team victory celebrations after the race as he had already left the track. He soon asked for his release and later joined Dale Earnhardt, Inc. following the sale of Ginn Racing. He drove the No. 01 Chevrolet in five races in 2007 and had the best finish of 30th.

2008–09

Almirola was named co-driver of the No. 8 United States Army-sponsored Chevrolet for the 2008 Sprint Cup Series, sharing the ride with Mark Martin. His best finish during the season was an eighth-place finish in the 2008 Food City 500 at Bristol, and his best start in Sprint Cup was a third-place start at the 2008 Goody's Cool Orange 500 at Martinsville. Almirola was named the full-time driver of the No. 8 for the 2009 season. Seven races into the 2009 season, Almirola lost his ride due to a lack of sponsorship. He later signed a five-race deal with Key Motorsports to drive their No. 40 Chevrolet Impala SS in the Nationwide Series. He returned to the Truck Series, driving part-time in the No. 15 Graceway Pharmaceuticals-sponsored Toyota Tundra for Billy Ballew Motorsports, and had a seven-race streak of finishes eighth or better. He also made one attempt and one race in the No. 09 Phoenix Racing Chevrolet in the Sprint Cup Series.
In October 2009, he filed paperwork in North Carolina Superior Court indicating that he has a breach-of-contract dispute with Earnhardt Ganassi Racing and Dale Earnhardt Inc. Almirola competed in seven Sprint Cup races in 2009 for the team before his No. 8 Chevy car was parked because of a lack of sponsorship. The lawsuit was dropped a month later after being settled out of court.

2010–2012: Resurgence in Truck and Nationwide

For 2010, he was to drive full-time for Phoenix Racing's No. 09 Cup series Chevrolet Impala.  He also drove the No. 51 Graceway Pharmaceuticals/AK Awareness-sponsored Toyota Tundra for Billy Ballew in the Camping World Truck Series. In April, Almirola parted ways with Phoenix Racing to focus on his Truck Series ride. Almirola attempted the Aarons 499 at Talladega in No. 35 Tommy Baldwin Racing/Mohawk-sponsored Chevrolet but failed to qualify after qualifying was rained out by NASCAR. Almirola won his first race in the Camping World Truck Series at Dover International Speedway and won again at Michigan International Speedway, holding off Todd Bodine and Kyle Busch. Almirola would finish second in points to Bodine.

Hendrick Motorsports named Almirola a standby driver for the No. 48 team in case Jimmie Johnson needed to leave for the birth of his daughter. Almirola was not needed. In July 2010, Almirola was again a standby driver for Hendrick Motorsports at Pocono in case Jeff Gordon had to leave or miss the race due to the birth of Gordon's son. At Loudon, he was on standby for a sick Scott Speed. He drove the No. 9 Richard Petty Motorsports Ford at Martinsville Speedway in Fall 2010 after Kasey Kahne was released from his contract. Almirola had his first Sprint Cup Top 5 finish at Homestead. At Talladega in the fall, he ended up in the closest finish in truck series history by ending up second to Kyle Busch in 0.002 of a second, who passed underneath Almirola below the yellow line. The 1-2 finish was the same as the previous race in 2009 but the finish was controversial because of the yellow line rules (as NASCAR rules state that a driver must not advance his position by going below the yellow line even if he is forced down there). But officials determined that Busch had the lead before going below the yellow line thus making Busch's winning move legal.
In 2011, Almirola drove the No. 88 Nationwide Series car for JR Motorsports. He won two poles and had 18 top-10s to finish fourth in points. He was released from his contract after the season when he accepted a full-time Sprint Cup ride, driving for Richard Petty Motorsports in the No. 43 Ford.

2012–2017: Return to Cup in the No. 43
 After only running one year's worth of Sprint Cup Series races in his career, Richard Petty Motorsports signed Almirola to a one-year contract, replacing the departing A. J. Allmendinger in the legendary 43 car. Almirola earned a Pole start at Charlotte in May, and collected one top 5 and four top 10s en route to a 20th-place finish in points. Aric's best run of the year may have been at Kansas in October, where he qualified fifth and lead 69 laps after taking the top spot on lap 6. But on lap 121, Almirola blew a tire, sending his Farmland Ford into the wall. He spun on lap 172 racing for the lead and lost a lap on pit road. After getting his lap back and working his way up to 13th, Almirola hit the wall once again, setting the front of the car ablaze and ending the promising run. Almirola also returned to the Truck Series in 2012 on a part-time basis driving for his old crew chief Richie Wauters' No. 5 Ford.

In 2013, Almirola returned to Richard Petty Motorsports' No. 43 in the Sprint Cup Series; at Martinsville Speedway in October, the team ran the No. 41 to honor Maurice Petty's induction into the NASCAR Hall of Fame. During the 2013 season from Texas to Talladega, he had the most consecutive Top 10s in the 43 car since Bobby Hamilton in 1996. After being fastest in practice in Talladega, his crew chief Todd Parrott was suspended for violating NASCAR's substance abuse policy. Almirola finished a career high 18th in points. In 2014, he received crew chief Trent Owens who is Richard Petty's nephew.

In January 2014, RPM announced a three-year contract extension with Almirola after working on one-year deals the previous two seasons. This coincided with sponsor Smithfield Foods stepping up to fund 29 races in each the next three seasons with brands Smithfield, Farmland, Eckrich, and Gwaltney. Almirola had a rather slow start to 2014, being involved in a 12-car wreck in the 2014 Daytona 500. At Bristol, Almirola posted his best cup finish to date, finishing 3rd.

The next week at Auto Club Speedway during the 2014 Auto Club 400, Almirola got involved in an accident with Brian Scott. Almirola made a pass on Scott for 4th place. Scott controversially moved into the back of Almirola to wreck himself and Almirola. In a post-race interview, an angry Almirola retorted "The 33 was obviously a dart without feathers and coming across the race track. He ran right into me. Man, he came from all the way at the bottom of the race track and ran into me. He's not even racing this series for points. He's out there having fun because his daddy gets to pay for it and he wrecked us. That's frustrating."

At the 2014 Coke Zero 400, Almirola would earn his first career win in the Sprint Cup Series after avoiding two major wrecks, and leading the field when the race was called off after 112 laps due to rain. His win also marked the first victory by the Richard Petty Motorsports No. 43 since 1999, and 30 years to the day Richard Petty won his 200th race. On his big victory Almirola said "The good Lord was watching out for us today and we were meant to win. It's real special for me to win here. This is not only the 30th anniversary of this team's last win at Daytona, it is my hometown and I remember growing up watching Daytona 500s and Firecracker 400s here. To win is real special."

Despite only scoring better than 20th only four times in the next few races, Almirola's win clinched a berth in the 2014 Chase for the Sprint Cup, his first Chase appearance and the first for a Cuban driver. Almirola was eliminated from the championship chase after round 1 of the Chase.

Almirola had a more successful year in 2015 despite missing the Chase barely. He had only six Top 10s but he was mainly in the Top 15 and was consistent all year long. he barely missed the chase by almost winning the Fall Richmond race with a strategy call and finished 4th. He finished 17th in the standings, the highest for a non-chaser.

He returned to the No. 43 in 2016 with Brian Scott as his new teammate.

In July 2016, Almirola, in the No. 98 car, won the Xfinity Series race at Daytona, for his first Xfinity Series win since 2007. He barely beat Justin Allgaier by 0.003 seconds to win the race. A final lap caution came out, with Almirola being declared the winner on review. In victory lane, an ecstatic Almirola said that he considered the race to be his first Xfinity Series win as he had won the 2007 Milwaukee race while Denny Hamlin drove 75% of the race. Almirola had a dismal 2016 season with just only collecting a top ten finish.

Almirola started the 2017 season without a teammate and finished 4th at the 2017 Daytona 500. Almirola was hit with a 35-point penalty loss after the Talladega race. During the Go Bowling 400 at Kansas Speedway on May 13, 2017, Almirola was involved in a violent crash along with Joey Logano and Danica Patrick. After Logano's brake rotor exploded, he collided with Patrick, sending both straight into the wall. Almirola attempted to avoid the wreck but instead slammed into Logano. Although he was conscious, Almirola was cut out of his car, placed onto a stretcher, and airlifted to the University of Kansas Hospital. Almirola was diagnosed with a compression fracture of his T5 vertebrae, released from the University of Kansas Hospital after overnight observation and traveled back to North Carolina, where he had a follow-up consultation with his doctors in Charlotte. Almirola was also reported to have the ability to walk the day after his violent wreck. It was expected that he would miss 8–12 weeks. He was replaced by Regan Smith for the Monster Energy Open, which led up to the Monster Energy NASCAR All-Star Race, the Coca-Cola 600, and the AAA 400 Drive for Autism. Darrell Wallace Jr. and Billy Johnson also substituted for Almirola. On June 29, 2017, Almirola stated he would undergo track tests in Charlotte or Darlington before being medically cleared to race in low-banking tracks like Indianapolis or New Hampshire to decrease stress on his back. On July 12, 2017, he announced he had been cleared to return to racing at Loudon's Overton's 301.

In September 2017, after sponsor Smithfield Foods announced that they would be leaving the team at season's end, Almirola announced his departure from Richard Petty Motorsports.

2018–present: Stewart-Haas Racing

On November 8, 2017, Stewart-Haas Racing announced Almirola as the driver of the No. 10 Ford Fusion for the 2018 season. Almirola was leading the 2018 Daytona 500 when on the race's last lap Almirola and eventual race winner Austin Dillon collided, resulting in Almirola crashing into the outside wall and finishing 11th. His consistency throughout the regular season brought him to the playoffs. At the inaugural Charlotte Roval race, Almirola was barely able to advance to the Round of 12 with a 19th-place finish after slamming the outside wall while avoiding William Byron, who cut a tire in front of him. He had a strong running at the fall Dover race until he got loose exiting the turn and collided with Brad Keselowski, which caused a multi-car pileup that took out Keselowski, Martin Truex Jr., and Alex Bowman. One week later, Almirola and Stewart-Haas Racing dominated the fall Talladega race. On the final lap, Almirola was running 2nd until his teammate Kurt Busch ran out of gas. Almirola scored his second career cup win, locking him into the Round of 8. Despite finishing fourth at Phoenix, Almirola was eliminated in the Round of 8. He finished the season fifth in the points standings, the highest finish of his career.

In the 2019 season, Almirola once again made the playoffs, but was eliminated in the Round of 16 after finishing 14th at the Charlotte Roval. 5 weeks later, Almirola contended with teammate and pole-setter Kevin Harvick for the win at Texas before finishing in 2nd-place, his best finish of the season. He fell to 14th in the final points standings. On December 4, 2019, Stewart-Haas Racing announced that Mike Bugarewicz will replace Johnny Klausmeier as the crew chief of the No. 10 team in 2020.

Almirola finished third at the 2020 GEICO 500 despite crossing the finish line nearly all the way backwards after being spun by Ricky Stenhouse Jr. Almirola led the most laps and won the second stage at Pocono the following week, and looked to be in a position to win until a poor final pit stop cost him the lead. Almirola finished 3rd. Almirola led 128 of the first 137 laps at Kentucky but his car did not do as well in lap traffic and he was unable to regain the lead; Almirola's teammate Cole Custer won the race. Almirola's consistency got him in the Playoffs for the third year in a row. He made it to the Round of 12, but was eliminated after the Charlotte Roval.

In 2021, Almirola won his duel and started third in the Daytona 500, but contact with Christopher Bell triggered the big one and knocked Almirola out of the race on lap 14. It was the fourth consecutive year in which Almirola did not finish on the lead lap in the Daytona 500. At New Hampshire Motor Speedway, with 57 laps to go, Almirola passed Ryan Blaney for the lead. He went on to collect his third career win over Christopher Bell after NASCAR shortened the race by 8 laps due to darkness. Almirola was eliminated from the playoffs following the conclusion of the Round of 16 at Bristol. He finished the season 15th in the points standings.

On January 10, 2022, Almirola announced his retirement from full-time racing after the 2022 season. He started the season with a fifth-place finish at the 2022 Daytona 500. Despite having no wins, Almirola's finishes were a huge improvement over the previous season, with two top-fives and seven top-10 finishes. On August 19, 2022, Almirola announced he would not retire at the end of the season and would continue to drive the No. 10 in 2023.

Personal life
Aric Almirola was born at Eglin Air Force Base in Florida, and raised in Tampa.  His family members are of Cuban descent. His grandfather Sam Rodriguez was a dirt sprint car driver.

Almirola is married to Janice Almirola, with whom he has two children: a son named Alex (born September 2012) and a daughter named Abby (born November 2013).

Motorsports career results

NASCAR
(key) (Bold – Pole position awarded by qualifying time. Italics – Pole position earned by points standings or practice time. * – Most laps led.)

Cup Series

Daytona 500

Xfinity Series

Camping World Truck Series

Camping World East Series

K&N Pro Series West

ARCA Re/Max Series
(key) (Bold – Pole position awarded by qualifying time. Italics – Pole position earned by points standings or practice time. * – Most laps led.)

* Season still in progress
1 Ineligible for series points

See also
List of Cuban Americans
List of NASCAR drivers
List of people from Tampa, Florida

References

External links

 
 Official profile at Stewart-Haas Racing
 

Living people
1984 births
People from Fort Walton Beach, Florida
Racing drivers from Tampa, Florida
NASCAR drivers
ARCA Menards Series drivers
ARCA Midwest Tour drivers
World Karting Association drivers
University of Central Florida alumni
American sportspeople of Cuban descent
Joe Gibbs Racing drivers
Dale Earnhardt Inc. drivers
JR Motorsports drivers
Stewart-Haas Racing drivers
Chip Ganassi Racing drivers